The 2011 Ashford Borough Council election took place on 5 May 2011 to elect members of Ashford Borough Council in Kent, England. The whole council was up for election and the Conservative Party stayed in overall control of the council.

Election result
The Conservatives gained 2 seats to have 30 of the 43 councillors. Labour picked up 3 seats, while the Ashford Independents made a net gain of 1 seat, to both have 5 councillors. Meanwhile, the Liberal Democrats were reduced to just 2 seats in North Willesborough and Victoria wards, a result that was blamed on the party's national unpopularity. Overall turnout in the election was 56%.

|}

2 Conservative candidates were elected unopposed.

Ward results

References

2011 English local elections
2011
2010s in Kent
May 2011 events in the United Kingdom